The 2003 NCAA Women's Gymnastics Championship was held in April 2003 and involved 12 schools competing for the national championship of women's NCAA Division I gymnastics.  It was the twenty second NCAA gymnastics national championship. The defending NCAA Team Champion for 2002 was Alabama.  The competition took place in Lincoln, Nebraska hosted by the University of Nebraska-Lincoln in the Bob Devaney Sports Center. The 2003 team championship was won by UCLA and the individual champion was Richelle Simpson, Nebraska, 39.800 points.

Team Results

Session 1

Session 2

Super Six

References

External links
 NCAA Gymnastics Championship Official site

NCAA Women's Gymnastics championship
NCAA Women's Gymnastics Championship